Carson is an unincorporated community in Baker County, in the U.S. state of Oregon, along Oregon Route 413 about  northwest of Halfway.
In 1870 Tom Corson settled in the area on a tributary of Pine Creek. His neighbors pronounced his name "Carson" and named the tributary and a sawmill on the creek after him. When the post office was established in 1893, it was named "Carson" as well. The town was platted in 1900, the first in Pine Valley. The platted area was small even by northeastern standards: 12 blocks. Carson lost out as a rural service center to the nearby Langrell.

In 1940 Carson had a population of 90. The post office closed in 1952.

References

Unincorporated communities in Baker County, Oregon
Populated places established in 1870
1870 establishments in Oregon
Unincorporated communities in Oregon